William Greenlee may refer to:

 Gus Greenlee (William Augustus Greenlee, 1893–1952), African-American businessman and Negro league baseball owner
 William K. Greenlee, Democratic Councilman-at-Large on the City Council of Philadelphia, Pennsylvania